is a Japanese voice actress and singer. She grew up in Tokyo and married on her birthday in 2007. She is contracted to the Space Craft Produce.

Biography 
Chiba took up ballet at a young age with ambitions of becoming part of Takarazuka Revue. However, having failed the entrance exam for Takarazuka Music School in her third year of middle-school, she joined the  a stage group for teenage girls.

Having had several lead roles over the three years she spent with the troupe, Saeko was then cast in the lead voice acting role of Kotori Haruno in the Dreamcast game Kita e. Having had a taste of being a voice actress and deciding that she preferred voice acting to performing on stage, Saeko decided to pursue the career full-time. Some of her earlier roles are her voice acting debut as Tsubaki Sakura in Kare Kano, Kitsune no Akane in Angel Tales, and Elliot Chapman in Sci-Fi Harry. Saeko was famed for her long, straight, black hair and seemingly cold outward appearance which led to her being cast in various tsundere and 'cool-girl' roles. She then cut her hair short in the spring of 2005, which strangely coincided with the increasing diversity of her roles, as Saeko herself noted on the My-HiME fandisc interview. Saeko has pursued a singing career with Yuki Kajiura, who wrote music for some of the Nanshō stage shows, writing and producing almost all her material. Her first single was Koi no Kiseki, the theme song for the PlayStation game Meguri Aishite. She has since released nine singles and two albums, along with various character song and drama CDs. She has also performed theme songs for games such as Alundra 2 and Atelier Judie. Saeko was also part of the group tiaraway with fellow Nanshō member Yuuka Nanri. Originally recording and performing as 'Saeko Chiba & Yuuka Nanri' for  Memories Off 2nd, the duo released three singles and an album before breaking up on March 6, 2005.

On February 17, 2011 Saeko gave birth to her first child, a daughter.

Filmography

Anime 
1998
 Kare Kano (Tsubaki Sakura)

2000
 Boogiepop Phantom (Yoko Sasaoka)
 Tottoko Hamtarō Dechu (Lapis-chan)
 Sci-Fi Harry (Elliot Chapman)

2001
 Angel Tales (Kitsune no Akane)
Ask Dr. Rin! (Meirin Kanzaki)

2002
 UFO Ultramaiden Valkyrie (Akina Nanamura)
 Heat Guy J (Kyoko Milchan)
 Duel Masters (Sayuki Manaka)

2003
 The World of Narue (Hajime Yagi)
 Nanaka 6/17 (Chie Kazamatsuri)
 Tenshi no Shippo Chu! (Fox Akane)
 Ultra Maniac (Maya Orihara)
 Avenger (Maple)
 UFO Ultramaiden Valkyrie 2: December Nocturne (Akina Nanamura)
 Chrono Crusade (Azmaria Hendric)

2004
 Gravion Zwei (Fei Shinruu)
 Aishiteruze Baby (Ayumi Kubota)
 Madlax (Chiara)
 Duel Masters Charge (Shayuki Manaka)
 Rockman EXE Stream (Jasmine)
 My-HiME (Natsuki Kuga)
 W Wish (Tsubasa Ohtori)
 Kujibiki Unbalance (Ritsuko Kyuberu Kettenkraftrad)

2005
 GUNxSWORD (Priscilla)
 Peach Girl (Momo Adachi)
 Bludgeoning Angel Dokuro-Chan (Dokuro Mitsukai)
 Buzzer Beater (Claire)
 MÄR (Aidou)
 Best Student Council (Miura)
 Tsubasa: RESERVoir CHRoNiCLE (Oruha)
 UFO Ultramaiden Valkyrie 3: Bride of Celestial Souls' Day (Akina Nanamura)
 Noein (Ai Hasebe)
 Rockman EXE Beast (Jasmine)
 Gunparade Orchestra (Noeru Sugawara)
 My-Otome (Natsuki Kruger)

2006
 Hell Girl (Yuuko Murai)
 Ayakashi (Oshizu)
 Bakegyamon (Kagari)
 Ray (Anna Takekawa)
 NANA (Miu Shinoda)
 Gin-iro no Olynssis (Marika)
 Code Geass: Lelouch of the Rebellion (Nina Einstein)
 Venus to Mamoru (Mitsuki Fujita)

2007
 D.Gray-man (Liza)
 Ghost Slayers Ayashi (Kiyohana)
 Nodame Cantabile (Reina Ishikawa)
 Bludgeoning Angel Dokuro-Chan 2 (Dokuro Mitsukai)
 GIANT ROBO (Maria Vovnich)
 Reideen (Akira Midorino)
 Nagasarete Airantou (Ayane)
 Bokurano (Chizu's older sister)
 Spider Riders: Yomigaeru Taiyou (Corona)
 Buzzer Beater 2 (Claire)
 Majin Tantei Nōgami Neuro (Shouko Hayami)
 Dragonaut: The Resonance (Widow)
 Goshūshō-sama Ninomiya-kun (Shinobu Kirishima)
 Shugo Chara! (Nadeshiko Fujisaki)
 Minami-ke (Hayami)

2008
 Rosario + Vampire (Rubi Tōjō)
 Shigofumi (Natsuka Kasai)
 Minami-ke: Okawari (Hayami-senpai, Hiroko)
 XxxHOLiC: Kei (Neko Musume)
 Psychic Squad (Bullet (Young), Chil Chil's Rival, Mary Ford, Momiji Kanou)
 Code Geass: Lelouch of the Rebellion R2 (Nagisa Chiba, Nina Einstein)
 Glass Maiden (Sofia)
 Scarecrowman (Elsa)
 Strike Witches (Mio Sakamoto)
 Birdy the Mighty: Decode (Birdy Cephon Altera)
 Mission-E (Yuma Saito)
 Blade of the Immortal (Ren)
 Rosario + Vampire Capu2 (Rubi Toujou)
 Shugo Chara!! Doki— (Nagihiko Fujisaki)
 Kemeko Deluxe! (Aoi-chan)

2009
 Shikabane Hime: Kuro (Rika Aragami)
 Minami-ke: Okaeri (Hayami-senpai, Hiroko)
 Birdy the Mighty Decode:02 (Birdy)
 Spice and Wolf II (Amartie)
 Jungle Emperor Leo (Professor Hikawa)
 Shugo Chara! Party! (Nagihiko Fujisaki)
 Kaidan Restaurant (Aya)

2010
 The Legend of the Legendary Heroes (Sion's Mother)

2011
 Wandering Son (Chizuru Sarashina)

2013
 Minami-ke Tadaima (Hayami)

OVA 
 .hack//Liminality (Yuki Aihara)
 Bludgeoning Angel Dokuro-Chan (Dokuro Mitsukai)
 Cosplay Complex (Maria Imai)
 Karas (Yoshiko Sagizaka)
 Iriya no Sora, UFO no Natsu (Akiho Sudou)
 Kikoushi-Enma (Yukihime)
 King of Bandit Jing in Seventh Heaven (Benedictine)
 Kujibiki Unbalance (Ritsuko Kübel Kettenkrad)
 Sci-Fi Harry (Elliott Chapman)
 Tristia of the Deep-Blue Sea (Panavia Tornado)
 My-Otome Zwei (Natsuki Kruger)
 Tetsuwan Birdy: Decode OVA "The Chiper" (Birdy Cephon Altera)
 Code Geass: Nunally In Wonderland (Nina Einstein)

Games 
 Alundra 2: A New Legend Begins (Aishia)
 Case Closed: The Mirapolis Investigation (Linda Hanayama)
 Chocolat~maid café curio (Kanako Akishima)
 Dengeki Bunko: Fighting Climax (Dokuro-Chan)
 Dengeki Gakuen RPG: Cross of Venus (Dokuro-Chan)
 Grandia III (Unama)
 Kita he~White Illumination (Kotori Haruno)
 Kita he~Photo Memories (Kotori Haruno)
 Memories Off 2nd (Takano Suzuna)
 My-HiME ~Unmei no Keitōju~ (Natsuki Kuga)
 Tales of Hearts (Beryl Benito)
 Tales of Vesperia (Nan)

Dubbing 
Sound of Colors (Dong Ling (Dong Jie))

Discography

Singles

Character singles

Albums

References

External links 

 Saeko Chiba at the Seiyuu database
 

1977 births
Living people
People from Hachinohe
Japanese video game actresses
Japanese voice actresses
Japanese women pop singers
Voice actresses from Aomori Prefecture
Musicians from Aomori Prefecture
Anime singers
20th-century Japanese actresses
20th-century Japanese women singers
20th-century Japanese singers
21st-century Japanese actresses
21st-century Japanese women singers
21st-century Japanese singers